In music, Op. 122 stands for Opus number 122. Compositions that are assigned this number include:

 Brahms – Eleven Chorale Preludes
 Shostakovich – String Quartet No. 11